Michel-Siméon Delisle (September 27, 1856 – October 11, 1931) was a Canadian merchant and politician.

Born in Pointe-aux-Trembles, Portneuf County, Canada East, the son of Albert Delisle and Dina Bertrand, Delisle was educated in Quebec City. A merchant, he was Mayor of Portneuf for five years. He was first elected to the House of Commons of Canada at the general elections of 1900 and he was re-elected in 1904, 1908, 1911, 1917, 1925, and 1926. A Liberal, he served for almost 30 years for the riding of Portneuf.

Electoral record

References
 
 The Canadian Parliament; biographical sketches and photo-engravures of the senators and members of the House of Commons of Canada. Being the tenth Parliament, elected November 3, 1904

1856 births
1931 deaths
Liberal Party of Canada MPs
Mayors of places in Quebec
Members of the House of Commons of Canada from Quebec